Gavliq (also Romanized as Gāvlīq) is a village in Tirchai Rural District, Kandovan District, Meyaneh County, East Azerbaijan Province, Iran. At the 2006 census, its population was 50, in 21 families.

References 

Populated places in Meyaneh County